Syntaxin-binding protein 3 is a protein that in humans is encoded by the STXBP3 gene.

Interactions 

Syntaxin binding protein 3 has been shown to interact with STX2 and STX4.

References

Further reading